Jim Fruchterman is an engineer and social entrepreneur. He was the founder and longtime CEO of Benetech, a Silicon Valley nonprofit technology company that develops software applications to address unmet needs of users in the social sector. He is the recipient of numerous awards, including the MacArthur Fellowship and the Skoll Award for Social Entrepreneurship.

Early life 
Fruchterman was born in Washington D.C. and grew up in the Chicago area. He graduated in 1976 from St. Viator High School in Arlington Heights, Illinois.

Fruchterman received his B.S. in Engineering and M.S. in Applied Physics from Caltech in 1980 and went on to Stanford University to pursue a PhD, but left school to join the Percheron private enterprise rocket project as its electrical engineer. The rocket blew up on the launch pad, but it launched Fruchterman's career as a serial entrepreneur.

Benetech 
In the Fall of 2018, Betsy Beaumon assumed the CEO role of Benetech and Fruchterman started a new nonprofit project called Tech Matters with a stated goal of taking what Benetech has learned about leveraging technology to help other nonprofits become more effective.

Honors and awards
Fruchterman received a MacArthur Fellowship in 2006 and the Outstanding Social Entrepreneur award in 2003 from the Schwab Foundation for Social Entrepreneurship. He received the Robert F. Bray Award in 2003 from the American Council of the Blind in recognition of his efforts to make published works accessible to people who are blind or visually impaired. In 2003, Fruchterman received the Francis Joseph Campbell award from the American Library Association for outstanding contribution to the advancement of library service for people who are blind or physically disabled. He also received the Access Award from the American Foundation for the Blind.

References

External links 
 
 Tech Matters
 Jim Fruchterman's Beneblog

1959 births
California Institute of Technology alumni
MacArthur Fellows
Living people
American social entrepreneurs